Crandall Peak is a mostly snow-covered peak,  high, located mid-way along the west wall of Pitkevitch Glacier in the Admiralty Mountains, a major mountain range lying in Victoria Land, Antarctica. The topographical feature was first mapped by the United States Geological Survey from surveys and from U.S. Navy air photos 1960–63, and named by the Advisory Committee on Antarctic Names for Lieutenant Eugene D. Crandall, U.S. Navy Reserve, an Aircraft Commander (LC-130F) with Squadron VX-6 during Operation Deep Freeze 1968. The peak lies situated on the Pennell Coast, a portion of Antarctica lying between Cape Williams and Cape Adare.

References
 

Mountains of Victoria Land
Pennell Coast